Phadia An Na Mohra is a town in the Islamabad Capital Territory of Pakistan. It is located at 33° 24' 40N 73° 24' 10E with an altitude of 507 metres (1666 feet).

References 

Union councils of Islamabad Capital Territory